Charles Talbot, 1st Baron Talbot,  (168514 February 1737) was a British lawyer and politician. He was Lord High Chancellor of Great Britain from 1733 to 1737.

Life
Talbot was the eldest son of William Talbot, Bishop of Durham, a descendant of the 1st Earl of Shrewsbury. He was educated at Eton and Oriel College, Oxford, and became a fellow of All Souls College in 1704. He was called to the bar in 1711, and in 1717 was appointed solicitor general to the prince of Wales. Having been elected a member of the House of Commons in 1720, he became Solicitor General in 1726, and in 1733 he was made Lord Chancellor and raised to the peerage with the title of Lord Talbot, Baron of Hensol, in the County of Glamorgan.

Talbot proved himself a capable equity judge during the three years of his occupancy of the Woolsack. Among his contemporaries he enjoyed the reputation of a wit; he was a patron of the poet James Thomson, who in The Seasons commemorated a son of his to whom he acted as tutor;  Joseph Butler dedicated his famous Analogy to Talbot, as was Upton's edition of Epictetus. The title he assumed derived from the Hensol estate in Pendoylan, Glamorgan, which came to him through his wife.

After an illness during which the King and Queen enquired after his health every day, Talbot died on 14February 1737 at his home in Lincoln's Inn Fields.

Talbot is remembered as one of the authors of the Yorke–Talbot slavery opinion, as a crown law officer in 1729. The opinion was sought to determinate the legality of slavery: Talbot and Philip Yorke opined that it was legal.  The opinion was relied upon widely before the decision of Lord Mansfield in Somersett's Case.

Family

Talbot married, in the summer of 1708, Cecil Mathew (died 1720), daughter of Charles Mathew of Castell y Mynach, Glamorganshire, and granddaughter and heiress of David Jenkins of Hensol. There he built a mansion in the Tudor style, known as the Castle. They had five sons, of whom three survived him:

John (died 22 Sep 1756)
William (16 May 171027 Apr 1782)
Rev. George (died 19 November 1782), who married Anne Bouverie, daughter of Jacob Bouverie, 1st Viscount Folkestone. They had four children, but only their sons lived to adulthood one of which was the Ver. Rev. Charles Talbot.

He was succeeded in the title by his second son, William (1710–1782).

References

Lord Campbell, Lives of the Lord Chancellors and Keepers of the Great Seal (8 vols. London, 1845–69)
Edward Foss, The Judges of England (9 vols. London, 1848–64)
Lord Hervey, Memoirs of the Reign of George II ( 2 vols. London. 1848)
G. E. Cokayne, Complete Peerage, vol. vii. (London, 1896)

Notes

Lord chancellors of Great Britain
Members of the Parliament of Great Britain for City of Durham
Members of the Privy Council of Great Britain
Fellows of All Souls College, Oxford
People educated at Eton College
Alumni of Oriel College, Oxford
Peers of Great Britain created by George II
1685 births
1737 deaths
Members of the Parliament of Great Britain for Tregony
British MPs 1715–1722
British MPs 1722–1727
British MPs 1727–1734
Charles
Barons Talbot